Sir Edward Bayntun (1593–1657) was an English politician who sat in the House of Commons variously between  1614 and 1653.

Bayntun was the son of Sir Henry Bayntun of Bromham, Wiltshire, and of his wife Lucy Danvers, a daughter of Sir John Danvers of Dauntsey, Wiltshire, and of the famous Elizabeth Neville. He was baptised at Bremhill on 5 September 1593. He matriculated at Christ Church, Oxford, on 27 April 1610, aged 17, and was knighted on 23 October 1613.

Bayntun was elected Member of Parliament for Devizes in 1614 and as a knight of the shire for Wiltshire in 1621. In 1624 and 1625, he was again elected as Member for Devizes, and in 1626 as Member for Chippenham. He was appointed High Sheriff of Wiltshire for 1637.

In April 1640, Bayntun was elected again for Chippenham to the Short Parliament, and in November of the same year to the Long Parliament. He sat in the Commons until 1653 and in 1648–1649 was a commissioner for the trial of the King but did not act.
 
Bayntun died in 1657 at the age of 64.

Bayntun married firstly Elizabeth Maynard, daughter of Sir Henry Maynard of Easton, Essex. Their son Edward was also a Wiltshire member of parliament. He married secondly Mary Bowell.

References

 

 

1593 births
1657 deaths
High Sheriffs of Wiltshire
Members of the Parliament of England (pre-1707) for Wiltshire
English MPs 1614
English MPs 1621–1622
English MPs 1624–1625
English MPs 1625
English MPs 1626
English MPs 1640 (April)
English MPs 1640–1648
English MPs 1648–1653